The 15279 / 15280 Poorbiya Express is a Express train belonging to Indian Railways – East Central Railway zone that runs between   &  in India.

It connects the major cities of Bihar and Uttar Pradesh like Saharsa, Barauni, Hajipur, Chhapra, Siwan, Deoria Sadar, Gorakhpur, Lucknow and Moradabad  with the national capital Delhi (Anand Vihar Terminal).
On 1 September 2019, catering facilities were introduced in this train.

Coaches

The 15279/15280 Poorbiya Express has 1 First AC, 1 First cum Second AC, 2 AC 2 tier, 3 AC 3 tier, 9 Sleeper Class, 1 Pantry Car, 3 General Unreserved & 2 EOG Generator Car Total 22 coaches.
As is customary with most train services in India, coach composition may be amended at the discretion of Indian Railways depending on demand.

Service

As the average speed of the train is below , as per Indian Railways rules, its fare does not include a Superfast surcharge.

Schedule

Route & Halts

Traction

As the route is fully electrified, a Ghaziabad Loco Shed-based WAP-7 (HOG)-equipped locomotive hauls the train for its entire journey.

Operation

 15279 Poorbiya Express runs from Saharsa Junction  every Sunday reaching Anand Vihar Terminal the next day .
 15280 Poorbiya Express runs from Anand Vihar Terminal every Monday reaching Saharsa Junction the next day .

References 

 http://www.90di.com/schedule/train/Indian%20Railways_15279.html
 http://www.90di.com/travel/?search_query=15280&search_type=freetext
 https://www.flickr.com/photos/wap5holic/8510218006/
 https://www.youtube.com/watch?v=amxfXm_vZuw
 http://www.irfca.org/gallery/GeneralScenes/gen5/SAMASTIPUR+_SPJ_+WDM-2+%2316573+is+today_s+link+to+Poorbiya+Express.jpg.html
 http://www.flickriver.com/photos/wap5holic/4066991515/
 http://www.flickriver.com/photos/wap5holic/8553862720/

External links

Transport in Saharsa
Transport in Delhi
Named passenger trains of India
Rail transport in Bihar
Rail transport in Uttar Pradesh
Rail transport in Delhi
Express trains in India